Le Futur Noir is the debut album of the punk rock band The Strays. It was released on 2006 under TVT records.  The band toured nationally with The Buzzcocks, The Cult and the Towers Of London following the release of the album. Their song "Life Support" is featured on the soundtrack for the Transporter 2 film starring Jason Statham.

Track listing
 Geneva Code
 Block Alarm
 You Are The Evolution
 Let Down Girls
 This is forever
 Peach Acid
 Miracles
 Future Primitives
 Start A Riot
 Life Support
 Kill
 Sirens
 Servant Of The Gun
(Hidden Track)

'Note
 The album contained a 'hidden' track, one of four  cover songs that was released on four different pressings of the CD which on any given version, a single one of these cover songs could be found at the end.  The songs covered were; The Replacements "Bastards Of Young", Lords Of The New Church "Black Girl/White Girl", Max Romeo "War Ina Babylon" and The Godfathers "Birth, School, Work, Death".

Personnel
Toby Marriott – guitar, Vox Organ
Dimitris Koutsiouris – bass, Vox Organ
Jeffrey Saenz – guitar, Vox
Dave Cobb – drums, producer
Matthew Rainwater – drums
Jimmy Lucido – touring drummer
Johnny Upton – drums
Gurj Bassi – assistant A&R
Leonard B. Johnson – A&R
Stacy Jones – drums, engineer, producer
Cary LaScala - Touring drummer
Bill Lefler – engineer, producer
Dave Sardy – mixing
Mark Rains – engineer, mixing
Paul David Hager – Engineer
Ryan Castle – mixing
Cameron Barton – mixing assistant
Ryan Castle – mixing
Rodney Mills – mastering
Darren Dodd – drums
Chrissie Good – photography
Tim Presley – artwork
Sandy Robertson – management

External links

2006 albums